Puerto Rico Highway 154 (PR-154) is a rural road in the municipality of Coamo, Puerto Rico. It is between the PR-153 and PR-543 near Salinas and Santa Isabel.

Major intersections

See also

 List of highways numbered 154

References

External links
 

154